Home, Vol. 5 is a split album released by Post-Parlo Records, the fifth volume in the Home series of short split albums featuring two artists. Vol. 5 features Benjamin Gibbard (Death Cab for Cutie, The Postal Service), and Andrew Kenny (The American Analog Set, The Wooden Birds), with the last song in each set being a cover of the other performer's respective band.

Track listing
Tracks 1-4 performed by Benjamin Gibbard, tracks 5-8 performed by Andrew Kenny.
"You Remind Me of Home" (2:16)
"Carolina" (2:25)
"Farmer Chords" (2:26)
"Choir Vandals" (The American Analog Set cover) (2:34)
"Hometown Fantasy" (2:16)
"Secrets of the Heart" (2:25)
"Church Mouse in the Church House" (2:26)
"Line of Best Fit" (Death Cab for Cutie cover) (5:03)

References

2003 EPs
2003 compilation albums
Split EPs
Ben Gibbard albums
Andrew Kenny albums